This was the fourteenth European Championship and was won for the sixth time by England.

Results

Final standings

References

European Nations Cup
European rugby league championship
European rugby league championship
International rugby league competitions hosted by the United Kingdom
International rugby league competitions hosted by France